There are at least 132 named lakes and reservoirs in Missoula County, Montana.

Lakes
 Beanhole Lake, el. 
 Beaver Lake, el. 
 Big Lake, el. 
 Big Sky Lake, el. 
 Blanchard Lake, el. 
 Boulder Lake, el. 
 Buck Lake, el. 
 Bull Lake, el. 
 Bunyan Lake, el. 
 Carlton Lake, el. 
 Cheff Lake, el. 
 Clearwater Lake, el. 
 Colt Lake, el. 
 Conko Lake, el. 
 Cott Lake, el. 
 Cottonwood Lakes, el. 
 Crazy Fish Lake, el. 
 Crescent Lake, el. 
 Crystal Lake, el. 
 Cygnet Lake, el. 
 Doctor Lake, el. 
 Eagle Lake, el. 
 Elbow Lake, el. 
 Elk Lake, el. 
 Farmers Lakes, el. 
 Finley Lakes, el. 
 Florence Lake, el. 
 Fly Lake, el. 
 George Lake, el. 
 Glacier Lake, el. 
 Glacier Lake, el. 
 Gray Wolf Lake, el. 
 Grizzly Lake, el. 
 Harpers Lake, el. 
 Harpers Lake, el. 
 Heart Lake, el. 
 Hemlock Lake, el. 
 Hidden Lake, el. 
 Hidden Lake, el. 
 High Park Lake, el. 
 Holland Lake, el. 
 Island Lake, el. 
 Jewell Lake, el. 
 Jim Lake, el. 
 Koessler Lake, el. 
 Kreis Pond, el. 
 Lace Lake, el. 
 Lagoon Lake, el. 
 Lake Alva, el. 
 Lake Dinah, el. 
 Lake Elsina, el. 
 Lake Inez, el. 
 Lake Marshall, el. 
 Lake Sa-ol-Sooth, el. 
 Lena Lake, el. 
 Lick Lake, el. 
 Lindbergh Lake, el. 
 Little Carlton Lake, el. 
 Little Lake, el. 
 Lockwood Lake, el. 
 Loco Lake, el. 
 Loon Lake, el. 
 Lost Lake, el. 
 Lost Lake, el. 
 Lost Sheep Lake, el. 
 Lower Cold Lake, el. 
 Lower Jocko Lake, el. 
 Marys Pond, el. 
 McClain Lake, el. 
 Meadow Lake, el. 
 Meadow Lake, el. 
 Mollman Lakes, el. 
 Mountaineer Lake, el. 
 Necklace Lakes, el. 
 North Hemlock Lake, el. 
 North One Horse Lake, el. 
 Notlimah Lake, el. 
 Onemile Pond, el. 
 Pasture Lake, el. 
 Pendent Lake, el. 
 Pierce Lake, el. 
 Placid Lake, el. 
 Rainy Lake, el. 
 Reed Lake, el. 
 Roosevelt Lake, el. 
 Rubble Lake, el. 
 Rumble Creek Lake, el. 
 Salmon Lake, el. 
Sapphire Lake, el. 
 Sappho Lake, el. 
 Seeley Lake, el. 
 Seepela Lake, el. 
 Skylark Lake, el. 
 Sleeping Elk Lake, el. 
 South One Horse Lake, el. 
 Spider Lake, el. 
 Spook Lake, el. 
 Spook Lake, el. 
 Stoner Lake, el. 
 Sudden Lake, el. 
 Summit Lake, el. 
 Summit Lake, el. 
 Sunset Lake, el. 
 Terrace Lakes, el. 
 The Angels Bathing Pool, el. 
 Tote Road Lake, el. 
 Tunnel Lake, el. 
 Tuppers Lake, el. 
 Turquoise Lake, el. 
 Twin Lakes, el. 
 Upper Cold Lake, el. 
 Upper Holland Lake, el. 
 Upper Jocko Lake, el. 
 Wapiti Lake, el. 
 Whelp Lake, el. 
 White Horse Lake, el. 
 Woodward Lake, el. 
 Worden Lake, el. 
 Yellow Lake, el.

Reservoirs
 Black Lake, el. 
 Carter Lake, el. 
 Glacier Lake, el. 
 Jocko Lake, el. 
 Lower Lake of Twin Lakes, el. 
 McKinley Lake, el. 
 Milltown Reservoir, el. 
 Sanders Lake, el. 
 Sanders Lake, el. 
 Sheridan Lake, el. 
 Spring Creek Reservoir, el. 
 Upper Lake, el.

See also
 List of lakes in Montana

Notes

Bodies of water of Missoula County, Montana
Missoula